A palmar ligament is one of several ligaments in or near the palm of the hand:
 Palmar radiocarpal ligament
 Palmar carpal ligament
 Palmar plate